Podontia is a genus of flea beetles in the family Chrysomelidae. They belong in the Blepharida-group of flea beetles.

Description
They are one of the largest representatives of flea beetles and with Podontia lutea adults being around 2 centimeters long, it is reputed that it is the largest flea beetle species in the world. They are distinguished from other genera in the Blepharida-group by their bifurcate prosternum, saddle-shaped mesosternum and strongly inwardly curved bifid tarsal claws.

Larval defense
In Podontia (along with some other related genera) larvae retain their feces directly on the dorsum (upside). This coating acts as a deterrent from predators such as ants. The fecal coat may also possibly serve to moderate body temperature or to reduce water loss although it has not been proven yet.

Species
Species include:

 Podontia affinis (Gröndal, 1808)
 Podontia congregata Baly, 1865
 Podontia dalmani Baly, 1865
 Podontia flava Baly, 1865
 Podontia jalur (Mohamedsaid, 1989)
 Podontia laosensis Scherer, 1969
 Podontia lutea (Olivier, 1790) 
 Podontia manilensis? (possibly a synonym for Asiophrida manilensis)
 Podontia quatuordecimpunctata (Linnaeus, 1767)
 Podontia rufocastanea Baly, 1865

Former species:
 Podontia basalis Baly, 1862: moved to Neoblepharella (formerly Blepharella)
 Podontia evanida Baly, 1865 moved to Calotheca
 Podontia marmorata Baly, 1865 moved to Calotheca
 Podontia nigrotessellata Baly, 1865 moved to Calotheca
 Podontia pitalohita (Maulik, 1926): synonym of Podontia rufocastanea Baly, 1865
 Podontia reticulata Baly, 1865 moved to Calotheca
 Podontia sacra Baly, 1865 moved to Calotheca
 Podontia soriculata (Swartz, 1808): moved to Paropsides
 Podontia vittata Baly, 1862: moved to Calotheca

See also
 List of flea beetle genera

References

Beetles described in 1846
Chrysomelidae genera
Alticini
Taxa named by Johan Wilhelm Dalman